Carl Jules Weyl (6 December 1890 – 12 July 1948) was a German art director. He won an Oscar in the category Best Art Direction for the film The Adventures of Robin Hood. He was also nominated in the same category for the film Mission to Moscow.

Early life and education
Weyl was born in Stuttgart, Germany. His father, Karl Friedrich Weyl, was an architect and field engineer of the Gotthard Rail Tunnel through the Alps. Carl Jules Weyl studied at the École des Beaux-Arts in Paris after architectural training in Berlin, Strasbourg, and Munich. He served as a first lieutenant of infantry in the German Reichswehr, according to his World War I draft registration card.

Architect and art director
Weyl immigrated to the US on 31 March 1912, according to his 1933 petition for citizenship, on the SS Königin Luise (1896). He worked as an architect in California, first in San Francisco for the architect John W. Reid, Jr., a designer of the San Francisco Civic Center and many schools. Weyl moved to Los Angeles in 1923, where he designed the Brown Derby Restaurant #2, the Hollywood Playhouse, the Gaylord Apartments, as well as many other buildings and Hollywood estates. Weyl was best man at the Beverly Hills wedding of film comedian Harry Langdon in 1929. When the Depression hit and building commissions dried up, Weyl joined Cecil B. DeMille Productions, then Warner Bros. as an art director. Weyl initially worked as an assistant to Anton Grot and Robert M. Haas. His first set for Warner Bros was the fountain in Footlight Parade.

Death
Weyl died in Los Angeles, California. He is interred in Forest Lawn Memorial Park, Glendale.

Selected filmography
 The Florentine Dagger (1935)
 Bullets or Ballots (1936)
 Kid Galahad (1937)
 The Adventures of Robin Hood (1938)
 Confessions of a Nazi Spy (1939)
 The Letter (1940)
 The Great Lie (1941)
 Kings Row (1942)
 Yankee Doodle Dandy (1942)
 Casablanca (1942)
 Mission to Moscow (1943)
 Passage to Marseille (1944)
 The Corn Is Green (1945)
 The Big Sleep (1946)
 Escape Me Never (1947)

References

External links

1890 births
1948 deaths
German art directors
Best Art Direction Academy Award winners
Architects from Stuttgart
Burials at Forest Lawn Memorial Park (Glendale)
German emigrants to the United States